The Randy Weston Trio is a jazz album by American jazz pianist Randy Weston recorded in 1955 and originally released on the Riverside label as a 10-inch LP. The tracks were later released on the 12-inch LP Trio and Solo with additional solo recordings from 1956.

Reception

Allmusic awarded the album 3 stars.

Track listing 
All compositions by Randy Weston except as indicated
 "Zulu" - 3:27  
 "Pam's Waltz" - 3:41  
 "Solemn Meditation" (Sam Gill) - 6:49  
 "Again" (Dorcas Cochran, Lionel Newman) - 5:02  
 "If You Could See Me Now" (Tadd Dameron, Carl Sigman) - 3:37  
 "Sweet Sue, Just You" (Will J. Harris, Victor Young) - 3:45

Personnel
Randy Weston - piano 
Sam Gill - bass (tracks 1-4 & 6)
Art Blakey - drums (tracks 1-4 & 6)

References 

Randy Weston albums
1955 albums
Riverside Records albums
Albums produced by Orrin Keepnews
Albums recorded at Van Gelder Studio